Brigadier-General Charles Granville Fortescue,  (20 October 1861 – 1 February 1951) was an officer of the British Army in the colonial wars of the late 19th century, the Second Boer War and the First World War.

Early life
The Honourable Charles Granville Fortescue was born on 30 October 1861, the sixth and youngest son of Hugh Fortescue, 3rd Earl Fortescue. Sir John Fortescue, the historian of the British Army, was his elder brother.

Fortescue was educated at Harrow School and was commissioned as a second lieutenant into the Rifle Brigade on 22 January 1881, rising to lieutenant on 1 July that year.

Military career
Fortescue saw his first active service with the 4th Battalion of his regiment in 1888–9 during the pacification operations in Upper Burma that followed the Third Anglo-Burmese War. Promoted to captain on 14 December 1890, he became adjutant of 4th Rifle Brigade in 1895. In 1897 he was employed by the Colonial Office in the Northern Territories of the Gold Coast, including an expedition to Karaga, receiving a Mention in Despatches and being appointed a Companion of the Order of St Michael and St George. Having achieved the rank of major on 5 December 1898, he was also promoted to brevet lieutenant colonel on 8 July 1899.

Fortescue returned from West Africa in 1899 to take up the post of private secretary to the Secretary of State for War, the Marquess of Lansdowne, but just before the outbreak of the Second Boer War he went to South Africa as a brigade major in the Natal Field Force under Sir George White. He was in the Siege of Ladysmith, and afterwards served as a staff officer in the operations in Northern Natal (including the action at Laing's Nek) and in Eastern Transvaal (including the actions at Belfast and Lydenburg). For the last six months of the war he relinquished staff work and commanded a column in the field. He was mentioned in despatches four times during the war and awarded the Distinguished Service Order. After the war ended, Fortescue stayed on for four months as military secretary to the general commanding the occupation force before returning to regimental duty. He left Port Natal on the SS Malta in late September 1902, together with other officers and men of the 2nd Battalion Rifle Brigade who were transferred to Egypt. He was appointed a Companion of the Order of the Bath in the 1911 Coronation Honours.

In April 1912, Fortescue was appointed Brigadier General, General Staff (BGGS) in Eastern Command. On the outbreak of the First World War in August 1914 he became BGGS to Third Army of Central Force within Home Forces, but shortly afterwards he was appointed to command a brigade of Regular Army troops returning from overseas garrisons for service on the Western Front. This became 80th Brigade in 27th Division and assembled around Winchester. The brigade included his old battalion, the 4th Rifle Brigade, returned from India, and the first Canadian volunteer unit to arrive in Europe, Princess Patricia's Canadian Light Infantry.

The 27th Division landed in France in December 1914 and was concentrated by 25 December. In February 1915 it was holding the line near St Eloi, with localised fighting going on. On 28 February the 'Princess Pat's' carried out a successful local attack. On 14 March the Germans made a surprise attack on 80th Brigade in the late afternoon, firing two mines and capturing St Eloi village, the surrounding trenches, and an artificial heap of earth known as 'The Mound'. There was severe hand-to-hand fighting in which the 2nd King's Shropshire Light Infantry and 4th Rifle Brigade distinguished themselves, but Fortescue was unable to make an immediate counter-attack because no reserves were on hand. The neighbouring 82nd Brigade did make a counter-attack after midnight that included 4th King's Royal Rifle Corps of 80th Brigade and retook some of the ground, but the Germans had already consolidated their hold on The Mound.

Shortly after St Eloi, Fortescue returned to Home Forces to take up the position of BGGS with First Army of Central Force. In November 1916 he received command of 212th Brigade of 71st Division, a new Home Defence formation composed of men who were unfit for overseas service. Once it had formed, 71st Division was assigned to guard the coast of Essex. After a year in command of 212th Brigade, Fortescue took over the 226th Mixed Brigade, which was attached to 71st Division. In January 1918 the War Office decided to break up the 71st Division by mid-March. Fortescue was then sent as part of a military mission to the Serbs fighting on the Macedonian front until the end of the war.

Fortescue was awarded the Serbian Order of the White Eagle, 1st Class, with swords. He retired from the British Army on 31 October 1919 with the honorary rank of brigadier general.

Family
In 1906 Fortescue married Ethel Rosa, daughter of General Sir Charles Clarke, 3rd Baronet and widow of Captain Ernest Campbell. They had two daughters:
 Anne Mary, born 17 July 1910, married 17 October 1929 to Henry Reginald Aked Garnett, who died in 1944.
 Lilah Rose, TD, born 15 October 1912, who served in the Auxiliary Territorial Service during the Second World War.

Before the First World War, Fortescue had accompanied his historian brother to some of the old battlefields of Europe, and he did a considerable amount of research for the last volume of Sir John's History of the British Army, which appeared in 1930.

Charles Fortescue died on 1 February 1951.

Notes

References
 Maj A.F. Becke,vHistory of the Great War: Order of Battle of Divisions, Part 1: The Regular British Divisions, London: HM Stationery Office, 1934/Uckfield: Naval & Military Press, 2007, .
 Maj A.F. Becke,vHistory of the Great War: Order of Battle of Divisions, Part 2b: The 2nd-Line Territorial Force Divisions (57th–69th), with the Home-Service Divisions (71st–73rd) and 74th and 75th Divisions, London: HM Stationery Office, 1937/Uckfield: Naval & Military Press, 2007, .
 Burke's Peerage and Baronetage 106th Edn, 1999.
 Brig-Gen J.E. Edmonds and Capt G.C. Wynne, History of the Great War: Military Operations, France and Belgium, 1915, Vol 1, London:  Macmillan, 1927/Imperial War Museum & Battery Press, 1995, .

External sources
 Armchair General on St Eloi

1861 births
People educated at Harrow School
Rifle Brigade officers
Graduates of the Staff College, Camberley
British Army generals of World War I
Companions of the Distinguished Service Order
Companions of the Order of the Bath
Companions of the Order of St Michael and St George
1951 deaths
Charles Granville
Younger sons of earls